was a Japanese nationalist, thinker, social activist, Japan Ground Self-Defense Force official, and member of a leading Japanese political family. He is best known for committing suicide through self-immolation as a nationalist protest in front of the Japanese Houses of Parliament.

Early life
Kosaburo Eto was born in Saga prefecture on 20 April 1946, the great-grandson of Eto Shinpei, a statesman during the Meiji restoration, the grandson of Eto Shinsaku, a member of the House of Representatives of Japan and close adviser of Inukai Tsuyoshi and the third son of Eto Natsuo, a member of the House of Representatives of Japan. He left  Japan Ground Self-Defense Force Cadet School in Yokosuka without a diploma.

Ritual suicide and an impact on Yukio Mishima
On 11 February 1969 (the National Foundation Day of Japan) aged 23, he committed suicide through self-immolation next to the Memorial Hall of Constitutional Politics, located in front of the Houses of Parliament. He left a kakuseisho (覚醒書) (suicide letter) expressing alarm over the state of the Nation.  In 1969 the leading Japanese literary figure and nationalist Yukio Mishima  noted in his　 as I am one of the readers who read the most intense criticism against the politics as a dream or art for seriousness of Young Kosaburo Eto, who set himself on fire.

Aftermath
On 11 February 1975, a memorial ceremony in honour of the life of Kosaburo Eto took place at Nogi Shrine,  in Akasaka, Tokyo.

Jisei no Uta (death poem)
Eto's kakuseisho ended with the following jisei or death poem, a common element in Japanese ritual suicide.:

「あらあらし　空にこみとり大楠の　大御心を誰ぞ知るらん」
Under the silhouette of the big camphor tree swinging in the stiff wind against the sky, I think - who knows the Mikado's will, perhaps nobody knows it.
「かくすれば　かくなるものと知りつつも　やむにやまれぬ　大和魂」
I know if I take risks, it makes no difference to me, but I dare to act with a Yamato Spirit.

He wrote three kakuseisho and sent them to Shintaro Ishihara, Yukio Mishima, and Kiyoshi Oka.

See also

References

External links

  A page about Kosaburo Eto.

1946 births
1969 suicides
Japanese activists
Suicides by self-immolation
Suicides in Japan